Tatarstan has competed in the Turkvision Song Contest three times. The region debuted in the inaugural  contest, and hosted the  contest in Kazan. Apart from the 2020 contest, Tatarstani broadcaster Maidan Television (MTV) has always organised a national final to select their entry.

History

2013
Tatarstan made their début in the Turkvision Song Contest at the 2013 festival, in Eskişehir, Turkey. It was announced on October 19, 2013 that Tatarstan would hold a televised selection for Turkvizyon with the final taking place on 21 November 2014. On 8 November 2013, the 20 artists taking part in the contest were announced, Alinä Şäripcanova won the selection with the song "Üpkälämim" (Үпкәләмим).

2014

2015
Tatarstan did not participate in the 2015 contest due to the state of Russia–Turkey relations. Before withdrawing from the contest, Tatarstan had selected the song "Siña kaytam", performed by Yamle, as their entry for the contest in a national final.

2020
Tatarstan's participation in the 2020 contest was confirmed in November 2020. Their entry was "Ğafu it, awılım" (Гафу ит, авылым), performed by the singer Diliya Ahmetshina.

Participation overview

Hostings

See also 
 Russia in the Turkvision Song Contest

References 

 
Countries in the Turkvision Song Contest